The Arab States have tried to form unions of several non-political organizations. Sport has been one of the main activities used to unify Arabs. Several tournaments and games were created to let Arab participate in sports, in an effort to bring the members of the  Arab world closer to each other.

Pan Arab Games

The Pan Arab Games were created in 1953 with a grand opening in Alexandria, which hosted the first Games; the games were supposed to take place every four years, like the Olympic Games. Several political problems have made this difficult. The Games included most of the same events as the Olympics. Egypt, with 985 medals over the years, is the leader in medal wins, followed by Syria with 692 medals, then Algeria with 624 medals. Mauritania and Comoros are the only two Arab States that never won a medal in the games.

Arab Olympic Achievements

In nearly 100 years of Olympic competition, the combined tally of medals won by all Arab countries is 73. At 22 countries, the Arab nations constitute almost 11 per cent of the total number of participating nations (204). However, the average number of medals won - 3.48 medals every four years - has been uninspiring. In the 2004 Summer Olympics in Athens, for example, Arab countries won only 10 of the 929 medals available - a little over one per cent.

Egypt

Though the modern version of the Olympic games began in 1896, it was not until 1912 that Arabs appeared on the international sporting scene. Egypt became the first Arab country to send an Olympic delegation - fencer Ahmed Hassanein - to the 1912 Summer Olympics in Stockholm.
Sixteen years later, Egypt won its first two gold medals, in weightlifting and wrestling, and a silver and bronze in diving at the 1928 Summer Olympics in Amsterdam. Since then it has maintained its competitive edge over other Arab countries and leads the Olympic chart among Arab nations with a total of 23 medals.

In the 2008 Summer Olympics in Beijing, Egypt sent the largest Arab delegation of more than 100 athletes competing in handball, field hockey, badminton, synchronised swimming, judo, boxing, taekwondo, athletics, fencing and the pentathlon.

Morocco
The 1984 Summer Olympics (Los Angeles) marked a watershed moment for Arab athletics when Morocco's Nawal El Moutawakel became the first Arab woman to win a gold medal, participating in the 400m hurdles.

Fellow countryman Saïd Aouita also brought home the gold in the 5000m men's marathon.
Moroccan talent continued to emerge as Hicham El Guerrouj returned from the 2004 Athens Olympics with two gold medals in the 1500m and 5000m races. Morocco is second to Egypt with 19 Olympic medals.

Football
Four African and four Asian members of the Arab League have qualified to the FIFA World Cup. Morocco advanced to round of 16 in 1986, Saudi Arabia in 1994, and Algeria in 2014. Neither team has reached quarter-finals.

The Union of Arab Football Associations, established in 1974, organizes the Arab Nations Cup and UAFA Club Championship.

African members of the Arab League have hosted 12 editions of the Africa Cup of Nations, with another scheduled for 2017:

 1957 Africa Cup of Nations - Sudan
 1959 Africa Cup of Nations - Egypt
 1965 Africa Cup of Nations - Tunisia
 1970 Africa Cup of Nations - Sudan
 1974 Africa Cup of Nations - Egypt
 1982 Africa Cup of Nations - Libya
 1986 Africa Cup of Nations - Egypt
 1988 Africa Cup of Nations - Morocco
 1990 Africa Cup of Nations - Algeria
 1994 Africa Cup of Nations - Tunisia
 2004 Africa Cup of Nations - Tunisia
 2006 Africa Cup of Nations - Egypt
 2019 Africa Cup of Nations - Egypt

Meanwhile, Asian members of the Arab League have hosted five editions of the AFC Asian Cup:

 1980 AFC Asian Cup - Kuwait
 1988 AFC Asian Cup - Qatar
 1996 AFC Asian Cup - UAE
 2000 AFC Asian Cup - Lebanon
 2011 AFC Asian Cup - Doha
 2019 AFC Asian Cup - UAE
The 2022 FIFA World Cup is scheduled to be held in Qatar. 2021 FIFA Arab Cup is also scheduled to be held in Qatar as a prelude to the World Cup.

Other hosted tournaments
 1978 All-Africa Games - Algiers
 1991 All-Africa Games - Egypt
 2006 Asian Games - Doha
 2007 All-Africa Games - Algiers
 2010 Asian Beach Games (Muscat)

Failed and withdrawn bids
 2011 Asian Indoor Games (Doha)
 2016 Summer Olympics (Doha)

See also
 Sports in Africa
 Sports in Asia
 Boycotts of Israel in sports

Arab League
Sport in Africa
Sport in Asia
Sport in the Arab world